Marie Hardiman (born 21 July 1975) is a female English former competitive swimmer.

Swimming career
Hardiman won a bronze medal in the 200-metre breaststroke at the 1993 European Aquatics Championships.  She finished 14th in the same event at the 1996 Summer Olympics.  In 1995 she set a national record in the same 200-metre breaststroke that stood for five years. At the ASA National British Championships she won the 100 metres breaststroke title in 1994, the 200 metres breaststroke title in 1993, 1994 and 1995 and the 400 metres medley title in 1994.

She represented England and won a silver medal in the medley relay event, at the 1994 Commonwealth Games in Victoria, British Columbia, Canada.

See also
 List of Commonwealth Games medallists in swimming (women)

References

1975 births
Living people
Swimmers at the 1996 Summer Olympics
Olympic swimmers of Great Britain
Female breaststroke swimmers
European Aquatics Championships medalists in swimming
Commonwealth Games medallists in swimming
Commonwealth Games silver medallists for England
Swimmers at the 1994 Commonwealth Games
Medallists at the 1994 Commonwealth Games